Dmytro Ivanovych Sartina (born 22 February 1992) is a Ukrainian professional footballer who plays as a centre-back for Ukrainian club Uzhhorod.

References

External links
 
 
 

1992 births
Living people
Sportspeople from Uzhhorod
Ukrainian footballers
Association football defenders
FC Shakhtar-3 Donetsk players
FC Helios Kharkiv players
MFC Mykolaiv players
FC Obolon-Brovar Kyiv players
MFC Mykolaiv-2 players
FC Uzhhorod players
Ukrainian First League players
Ukrainian Second League players